Shimia aquaeponti is a Gram-negative, aerobic, rod-shaped and non-motile bacterium from the genus of Shimia which has been isolated from seawater from the Geoje island in Korea.

References 

Rhodobacteraceae
Bacteria described in 2015